Robert Foster Chapman (April 24, 1926 – April 18, 2018) was a United States circuit judge of the United States Court of Appeals for the Fourth Circuit and a former United States District Judge of the United States District Court for the District of South Carolina.

Education and career

Born in Inman, South Carolina, Chapman was an ensign in the United States Navy during World War II, from 1943 to 1946. He received a Bachelor of Science degree from the University of South Carolina in 1945, and a Bachelor of Laws from University of South Carolina School of Law in 1949. He was in private practice in Spartanburg, South Carolina from 1949 to 1951, then returned to the United States Navy as a lieutenant from 1951 to 1953 before returning to private practice in Spartanburg until 1971. Chapman served as chairman of the South Carolina Republican Party from 1962 to 1963.

Federal judicial service

On May 18, 1971, Chapman was nominated by President Richard Nixon to a new seat on the United States District Court for the District of South Carolina created by 84 Stat. 294. He was confirmed by the United States Senate on May 26, 1971, and received his commission on May 27, 1971. His service terminated on October 2, 1981, due to elevation to the Fourth Circuit.

Chapman was nominated by President Ronald Reagan on July 16, 1981, to a seat on the United States Court of Appeals for the Fourth Circuit vacated by Judge Clement Haynsworth. Chapman was confirmed by the Senate on September 16, 1981, receiving his commission on September 19, 1981. He assumed senior status on May 31, 1991, after which his seat was filled by Karen J. Williams. His service terminated on April 18, 2018, upon his death.

See also
 List of United States federal judges by longevity of service

References

Sources
 

1926 births
2018 deaths
20th-century American judges
21st-century American judges
Judges of the United States Court of Appeals for the Fourth Circuit
Judges of the United States District Court for the District of South Carolina
South Carolina Republicans
United States court of appeals judges appointed by Ronald Reagan
United States district court judges appointed by Richard Nixon
United States Navy officers
University of South Carolina alumni
People from Inman, South Carolina
Military personnel from South Carolina
United States Navy personnel of World War II